David James Ball (born 3 May 1959) is an English producer and electronic musician, who has played in bands such as Soft Cell and The Grid, and collaborated with other producers including Ingo Vauk and Chris Braide. He is usually called Dave Ball on record sleeves.

Life and career
Ball was born in Chester, Cheshire, England, later adopted and brought up in Blackpool. He studied at Arnold School before studying art at Leeds Polytechnic, where he met Marc Almond; they formed the synthpop duo Soft Cell in 1978, the band lasting until 1984. In 1983, while with the group, he released a solo album, In Strict Tempo, which featured Gavin Friday, Genesis P-Orridge and Virginia Astley. Later he collaborated with P-Orridge on the soundtrack for the West German film Decoder, which also featured other Some Bizzare artists.

After Soft Cell disbanded, Ball formed a new band, Other People with his then-wife Gini Hewes (who previously worked with Almond in Marc and the Mambas) and Andy Astle, but they released only one single, "Have a Nice Day". In the late 1980s, he formed another short-lived band, English Boy on the Loveranch, with Nick Sanderson and Jamie Jones, releasing two hi-NRG singles, "The Man in Your Life" and "Sex Vigilante". He also was part of Psychic TV, working on the compilation albums Jack the Tab and Tekno Acid Beat, where he met Richard Norris (they recorded the track "Meet Every Situation Head On" together as M.E.S.H.) and with whom he later formed the Grid.

Ball reunited with Almond in Soft Cell in 2001, releasing new album Cruelty Without Beauty. In 2010, he formed the band Nitewreckage with Celine Hispiche, Rick Mulhall and Terry Neale. Their debut album, Take Your Money and Run, was released on Alaska Sounds on 6 June 2011, with the single "Solarcoaster" preceding it. The album was co-produced and mixed by Martin Rushent. In 2016, Ball and classical pianist Jon Savage collaborated on the experimental electronic album Photosynthesis. In 2018, Soft Cell saw another reunion for a final live show, celebrating their 40th anniversary since the duo was formed.

Ball also worked as a producer, with Vicious Pink Phenomena (who started as a backing duo for early Soft Cell), the Virgin Prunes and the Rose McDowall side-project Ornamental in the 1980s, and later with Kylie Minogue, Gavin Friday and Anni Hogan. He also remixed for artists and bands such as David Bowie, Vanessa-Mae and Erasure (many remixes were also made with Norris as The Grid). Ball also worked with Friday on a cover of Suicide's "Ghost Rider" for the Alan Vega 70th Birthday Limited Edition EP Series.

Ball lives in Kennington, south London.

Discography
 In Strict Tempo (1983, Some Bizzare, Phonogram)
 Photosynthesis (with Jon Savage, 2016, Cold Spring)

References

1959 births
People educated at Arnold School
English keyboardists
English new wave musicians
English electronic musicians
English record producers
People from Blackpool
Alumni of Leeds Beckett University
Living people
British synth-pop new wave musicians
Remixers
Soft Cell members
Some Bizzare Records artists